The Braunschweiger Verkehrs-AG is responsible for public transport in Braunschweig, Germany.

Public transport operators of Germany
Companies based in Braunschweig
Transport in Braunschweig
1100 mm gauge railways in Germany